= Goldirocks =

- Directed by: Paula Tiberius
- Written by: Paula Tiberius
- Produced by: Lisa Hayes
- Starring: Sasha Ormond; Greg LeGros; Laura Kim; Dominick Abrams; Dru Viergever; Megan Dunlop
- Cinematography: Marcos Arriaga
- Edited by: Vanda Schmoeckel
- Music by: John Critchley
- Production company: Goldirocks Inc.
- Release date: 29 August 2003 (Montréal World Film Festival)
- Running time: 94 minutes
- Country: Canada
- Language: English

Goldirocks is a 2003 Canadian musical comedy film directed by Paula Tiberius, starring Sasha Ormond, Greg LeGros, Laura Kim, Dominick Abrams, Dru Viergever and Megan Dunlop.

== Cast ==
- Sasha Ormond as Goldi
- Greg LeGros as Miles
- Laura Kim as Lil
- Dominick Abrams as Adler
- Dru Viergever as Darby
- Megan Dunlop as Rhonda

== Reception ==
Eddie Cockrell of Variety called the film an "Energetic verisimilitude of snappy music fairytale" that is "undercut by grating in-your-face lead thrush."

Monica S. Kuebler of Exclaim! wrote that while the film "misses several key chords", it "jams with some serious spirit and homespun, low-budget determination."

Geoff Pevere of the Toronto Star wrote that while the film is "marred" by "tentative" performances and Tiberius' "fondness for stock sitcom cuteness", it "knows and loves Goldi's seedy-but-sincere scene and it makes joyful musical noise."
